Pinch Gut Creek is a stream in Brunswick County, North Carolina, in the United States.

Pinch Gut Creek was so named by the Native Americans on account of there being too little food available in that area.

See also
List of rivers of North Carolina

References

Rivers of Brunswick County, North Carolina
Rivers of North Carolina